Netupitant is an antiemetic medication. In the United States, the combinations of netupitant/palonosetron and fosnetupitant/palonosetron (brand name Akynzeo) are approved by the Food and Drug Administration for the prevention of acute and delayed chemotherapy-induced nausea and vomiting, including highly emetogenic chemotherapy such as with cisplatin. In the European Union, the combinations are approved by the European Medicines Agency (EMA) for the same indication.

Adverse effects
Side effects of the combination netupitant/palonosetron are similar to palonosetron alone, so that no common side effects can be attributed to netupitant.

Interactions
Netupitant blood plasma levels are expected to increase when combined with inhibitors of the liver enzyme CYP3A4 and lowered when combined with inductors of this enzyme.

Being a CYP3A4 inhibitor itself, netupitant could also increase plasma levels of pharmaceuticals that are metabolized by CYP3A4. This effect has been observed with dexamethasone, the anti-cancer drugs docetaxel and etoposide, and to a minor (not clinically significant) extent with levonorgestrel, erythromycin and midazolam.

Pharmacology

Mechanism of action
Netupitant is a selective NK1 receptor antagonist.

Netupitant is a selective neurokinin 1 (NK1) receptor antagonist with potential antiemetic activity. Netupitant competitively binds to and blocks the activity of the human substance P/NK1 receptors in the central nervous system (CNS), thereby inhibiting NK1-receptor binding of the endogenous tachykinin neuropeptide substance P (SP), which may result in the prevention of chemotherapy-induced nausea and vomiting (CINV). SP is found in neurons of vagal afferent fibers innervating the brain-stem nucleus tractus solitarii and the area postrema, which contains the chemoreceptor trigger zone (CTZ), and may be elevated in response to chemotherapy. The NK-receptor is a G-protein receptor coupled to the inositol phosphate signal-transduction pathway and is found in both the nucleus tractus solitarii and the area postrema.

Pharmacokinetics
Bioavailability is estimated to be over 60% for orally taken netupitant. Highest blood plasma concentrations are reached five hours after application. Availability is moderately (10–20%) increased when taken after a fatty meal. Netupitant and its main metabolites (called M1 and M3) are bound to plasma proteins to more than 99%, and M2 protein binding is 97%.

The substance is mainly metabolized by CYP3A4, and to a lesser extent by CYP2D6 and CYP2C9. The main metabolites are desmethyl-netupitant (M1), netupitant N-oxide (M2), and hydroxy-netupitant (M3); all three are pharmacologically active.

Netupitant and its metabolites are mainly excreted via the faeces. Biological half-life is 88 hours, significantly longer than that of the first NK1 receptor antagonist, aprepitant, which has a half-life of 9 to 13 hours.

References

External links
 
 

Antiemetics
NK1 receptor antagonists
Trifluoromethyl compounds
Piperazines
2-Tolyl compounds